Nonagria is a genus of moths of the family Noctuidae first described by Ferdinand Ochsenheimer in 1816.

Description
Its eyes are naked and without lashes. The proboscis is thin. Palpi obliquely porrect (extending forward), where the second joint evenly scaled and third joint prominent. Thorax and abdomen tuftless. Tibia spineless. Wings with non-crenulate cilia. Forewings with the acute apex. Hindwings with stalked veins 6 and 7 or from cell.

Species
 Nonagria fumea (Hampson, 1902)
 Nonagria grisescens (Hampson, 1910)
 Nonagria intestata Walker, 1856
 Nonagria leucaneura (Hampson, 1910)
 Nonagria lineosa Maassen, 1890
 Nonagria monilis Maassen, 1890
 Nonagria puengeleri (Schawerda, 1924)
 Nonagria typhae (Thunberg, 1784)

References

Hadeninae
Moth genera
Taxa named by Ferdinand Ochsenheimer